Bath Place was a prominent London residence that had belonged to the Bishops of Bath and was near the King's residence.

On 27 June 1539, it was 'assured in Parliament to William Fitzwilliam, Earl of Southampton, who was living there in April of that year. After that, it was known for a time as Hampton Place.' It was owned by William Fitzwilliam, Earl of Southampton until his death in 1543.

References

Buildings and structures in London